Edimar Ribeiro da Costa Junior (born 26 February 1999), commonly known as Juninho, is a Brazilian footballer who plays as a forward for Bahraini side Al-Najma on loan from Bulgarian club CSKA 1948 II.

International career
Juninho was called up to the Brazil under-20 squad for the 2017 Toulon Tournament. He made his first appearance as a second half substitute for Gabriel Novaes in a 1–0 win over Indonesia.

Career statistics

Club

Notes

References

1999 births
Living people
Brazilian footballers
Brazil under-20 international footballers
Brazil youth international footballers
Association football forwards
Campeonato Brasileiro Série A players
First Professional Football League (Bulgaria) players
Sport Club do Recife players
FC Arda Kardzhali players
FC CSKA 1948 Sofia players